Allapur is a village in Choutuppal mandal, Yadadri Bhuvanagiri in Telangana, India.

References

Villages in Yadadri Bhuvanagiri district